Terence Sydney Peirce (7 September 1930 – 31 March 1984) was an Australian rules footballer who played with Melbourne in the Victorian Football League (VFL).

Notes

External links 

1930 births
1984 deaths
Australian rules footballers from Tasmania
Melbourne Football Club players
Latrobe Football Club players